Oleg Vyacheslavovich Suvorov (born 23 February 1997) is a Russian football player. He plays for FC Biolog-Novokubansk.

Club career
He made his debut in the Russian Professional Football League for FC Dynamo Stavropol on 17 September 2016 in a game against FC Armavir.

He made his Russian Football National League debut for FC Fakel Voronezh on 12 August 2018 in a game against FC Sibir Novosibirsk.

References

External links
 Profile by Russian Professional Football League

1997 births
Sportspeople from Stavropol
Living people
Russian footballers
Association football goalkeepers
FC Dynamo Stavropol players
FC Fakel Voronezh players